Istria (Croatian and Slovene: Istra; Istriot: Eîstria; Istro-Romanian, Italian and Venetian: Istria) is the largest peninsula in the Adriatic Sea. The peninsula is located at the head of the Adriatic between the Gulf of Trieste and the Bay of Kvarner. It is shared by three countries: Croatia, Slovenia, and Italy.

Prehistory
The first known appearance of human life in Istria dates to Lower Paleolithic, as evidenced by artifacts found in Šandalja Cave near Pula, dated to 800,000 BC.

Since 11th century BC, Istria was inhabited by the Histri, a prehistoric Illyrian tribe after whom Istria was named. Their arrival marks the beginning of the Iron Age in Istria. Another Illyrian tribe that inhabited the area were the Liburnians. The westernmost extents of their land, Liburnia, covered the area east of the Raša River.

Roman Istria

After a series of conflicts, the Romans conquered the Histri and took power of the Istria peninsula in 178 and 177 BC. Romans established the port of Pietas Iulia (modern Pula) and gradually converting the inland areas into latifundia, large estates worked by colonists and locals. Although pockets of Illyrian resistance remained in the hilly interior, they succumbed in time to the Romans’ combination of military and economic superiority. Although Pula is Istria's only settlement to preserve significant evidence of the Romans (principally its Forum and Amphitheater), most of Istria's major settlements were established in this period. Under Emperor Augustus, Istria was incorporated into the region of Venetia et Histria, as part of the Roman mainland of Italia. It remained under Roman rule until the fall of the Western Roman Empire in 476.

Christianity appeared in Istria in late 3rd century AD, and the first churches were built in the 4th century. The period between 2nd and 5th century AD saw the incursions of Germanic tribes, a sustained influx of refugees from Pannonia and other provinces, political instability amid infighting for the Roman throne, and decline of the economy.

Following the fall of the Western Roman Empire (476), the region was ruled by Odoacar, and later conquered by the Ostrogoths in 489 AD.

Byzantine Istria

In 538/539, Istria was incorporated into the Byzantine Empire, and consequently placed under administrative and military jurisdiction of the Exarchate of Ravenna. Local administration in Istria was headed by provincial magister militum. After the Lombard invasion of Italy (568), Istria was exposed to several Lombard attacks during the next two centuries, but remained under Byzantine rule. During that period, it enjoyed substantial provincial self-governance, because of its peripheral position. After the fall of the Exarchate in 751, Istria remained under Byzantine rule until 788, when it was conquered by the Frankish kingdom.

During the Byzantine period, significant changes emerged at eastern borders of Istria. In 599, first attacks of Avars and Slavs on Istrian borders were recorded. At the beginning of 7th century, Istrian eastern and inland regions were invaded by Slavs, while the coastal area resisted these attacks. This period was highly contentious, because of Lombard attacks from the West, Slovene attacks from the north, and Croat attacks from the east, resulting in a state of near constant conflict, particularly between Byzantine-held littoral and Slavic inhabitants in inland regions.

Avaro-Slavic invasions and settlement
In 599, the first Avaro-Slavic invasion of Istria was recorded. This invasion chiefly involved the hinterland, but possibly threatened the coast as well, triggering a response from Ravenna. In the following year (600) the Avars and Slavs invaded Italy after passing through Istrian territory. The locals probably retired in the walled cities, leaving the main routes unguarded.
Around 600 to 602, the Avars and the Slavs, perhaps instigated by the Lombards, penetrated into Istria, devastating it all with fire and rapine. In 611, the Avars and Slavs pillaged Friuli before attacking Istria again. On this occasion, they inflicted what might have been the worst defeat for the locals. Some ancient historians and reporters, such as Gregorius Anicius, later Pope Gregory the Great, unaware of the importance of the Avars in the Balkans, used the terms Slavs, or Sclavenes, in connection to Istria and the other Balkanic zones, to refer to the Avars and/or the Avaro-Slavic hordes. Gisulf, Duke of Friuli (c. 590-c. 610), who died during an Avar invasion of Istria, is thought to have conducted raids against the Avars and the Slavs in Istria, perhaps after making a deal with the Byzantines. In 619, the Avar khagan allegedly made a deal with Emperor Heraclius for the settlement of Slavs in northern Istria. The mission of an abbot Martin sent by Pope John IV to "travel the length of Dalmatia and Istria with large sums of money for the redemption of captives held by pagans" in 640–642, indicates that by that time the Slavs had settled in the region.

Fianona (Plomin) was completely destroyed by the Avars in their early invasions of the 7th century, and was rebuilt as late as the 11th century, having disappeared from the records. Among the other cities destroyed by the Avars and Slavs is Gallignana (Gračišće), which ceased to be a castrum, and Nesactium. The basilica of Vrsar was probably burned during one of the Avaro-Slavic invasions, and it has been suggested that also the church of St Fusca (Sveta Foška) near Žminj (Gimino) suffered the same fate by the same hands. Several other settlements disappeared with these incursions, possibly including the still unidentified Mutila, Faveria and Cissa, mentioned by Pliny, which utterly disappeared from history.

Traces of early Slavic settlement in Istria, and of the Slavic raids, are scarce. Some Avar findings were discovered in Istria, such as two Avar three-winged arrows, found in Nesactium, a belt harness found in Novigrad (Cittanova), and a belt plaque found near Nesactium (near Valtura, in eastern Istria). While historians consider it unlikely, ancient records don't exclude the possibility that, besides Slavs, Avars lived in Istria, as Constantine VII claimed that a minority ethnic group, recognized as Avars, lived in his time in the Kingdom of Croatia, which included eastern Istria. While Avars may have been active and even controlled regions in present-day Croatia and Slovenia, they are thought to have only lived in Pannonia (present-day Hungary), as this is the only place where Avar burials have been found.

After the Avaro-Slavic defeat at the siege of Constantinople in 612, the Slavs might've split from their Avar masters and settled into Byzantine territory. According to Gianni Oliva, following the Barbarian invasions of the 6th century, in Istria there was a mixing of people, after which two distinct ethnic divisions emerged: the Italians, who derived from the preexisting Romans, and the Slavs, who derived from the intermixing of Croats and Avars. Some historians have argued that Istria was actually colonized by Carnolian Slavs, with August Dimitz reporting that this was the belief during his day. Indeed, according to one current theory, the first wave of Slavic-speaking settlers entered Istria in the late 6th century, but according to another theory, the Slavs entered first the Karst area, and then entered Istria from the north, above Trieste (in present-day Slovenia) in the 7th century.

Frankish and Venetian rule

Istria was annexed to the Frankish kingdom by Pepin of Italy in 788. The seeds of Istria's dissolution were sown under increasingly weak Frankish rule, which enabled most settlements to achieve de facto autonomy.

In the 10th and 11th centuries, Istria was ruled by the German feudal families. Since mid-11th century, Istria was a separate markgraviate, given in hereditary feud to various families of noblemen by German emperors, the dukes of Carinthia, Merano and Bavaria. The German emperor Henry IV nominally assigned the remaining march to the Patriarchate of Aquileia. According to Constantine Porphyrogennetos, eastern parts of Istria north of Raša River at that time belonged to Croatian Kingdom.

In 1145, the cities of Pula, Koper and Izola rose against the Republic of Venice but were defeated, and were since further controlled by Venice. During the 13th century, the Patriarchate's rule weakened and the towns kept surrendering to Venice – Poreč in 1267, Umag in 1269, Novigrad in 1270, Sveti Lovreč in 1271, Motovun in 1278, Kopar in 1279, and Piran and Rovinj in 1283. Venice gradually dominated the whole coastal area of western Istria and the area to Plomin on the eastern part of the peninsula. The wealthier coastal towns cultivated increasingly strong economic relationships with Venice and by 1348 were eventually incorporated into its territory, while their inland counterparts fell under the sway of the weaker Patriarchate of Aquileia, which became part of the Habsburg Empire in 1374.

Holy Roman Empire and the Habsburg Empire

The inner Istrian part around the town of Pazin, named Pazin County, with its stronghold Pazin Castle, was part of the Holy Roman Empire. It was held by the County of Gorizia after the 1100s, and was passed to the House of Habsburg in 1365.

The Venetian part of the peninsula passed to it in 1797 with the Treaty of Campo Formio.

Napoleonic rule
Following the fall of the Venetian Republic (1797), Istria was occupied by Napoleon; however, he gave Venice and the Venetian part of Istria and Dalmatia to Austria, in exchange for the Netherlands and Lombardia.

In 1805, Napoleon re-occupied the former Venetian Istria. The Holy Roman Empire ended with the period of Napoleonic rule from 1805 to 1813, when Istria became part of the Italian Kingdom and, from 1809, of the Illyrian provinces of the Napoleonic Empire. For the first time, inner and eastern parts of Istria became a part of Croatia, as a part of Civil Croatia, established by Napoleon.

Austrian rule

After this short period, the newly established Austrian Empire ruled entire Istrian territory from 1814 until 1918. Istria became the part of the Empire as a separate territorial unit, with Trieste as its capital. Pazin became its capital in 1825. In 1866 Pula became the capital port of the Austrian Empire Navy.

The introduction of limited democracy in 1861, by means of a regional parliament (Diet of Istria) that convened at Parenzo (Poreč), only served to its purpose to the Austrians in defusing Italian calls for the region's union with the newly established Kingdom of Italy, as suffrage was limited to property owners, who were primarily Italian. The first parliament consisted of 28 Italians, but only one Croat and one Slovene.

Many Istrian Italians looked with sympathy towards the Risorgimento movement that fought for the unification of Italy. However, after the Third Italian War of Independence (1866), when the Veneto and Friuli regions were ceded by the Austrians to the newly formed Kingdom Italy, Istria remained part of the Austro-Hungarian Empire, together with other Italian-speaking areas on the eastern Adriatic. This triggered the gradual rise of Italian irredentism among many Italians in Istria, who demanded the unification of Istria with Italy. The Italians in Istria supported the Italian Risorgimento: as a consequence, the Austrians saw the Italians as enemies and favored the Slav communities of Istria, fostering the nascent nationalism of Slovenes and Croats.

During the meeting of the Council of Ministers of 12 November 1866, Emperor Franz Joseph I of Austria outlined a wide-ranging project aimed at the Germanization or Slavization of the areas of the empire with an Italian presence:

There are claims Istrian Italians were more than 50% of the total population for centuries, while making up about a third of the population in 1900. However, in the part of Istria that eventually would became part of Croatia, the first Austrian census from 1846 found 34 thousand Italian speakers, alongside 120 thousand Croatian speakers. Until 1910, the proportion changed: there were 108 thousand Italian speakers and 134 thousand Croatian speakers. Vanni D'Alessio notes (2008), the Austrian surveys of the language of use (in the Austrian censuses, the ethnic composition of the population wasn't surveyed, only the "Umgangsprache") "overestimated the diffusion of the socially dominant languages of the empire...  The capacity of assimilation of the Italian language suggests that amongst those who declared themselves Italian speakers in Istria, there were people whose mother tongue was different."   In the second half of the 19th century, there was a fight for the national and political rights of the Croatian and Slovenian population in relation to the Italian population, strongly influenced by the Croatian national revival. Bishop Juraj Dobrila was the leader of the battle for Croatian rights in Istria. His concept was the activation of the people in the field of the national self-defence, the preservation of tradition, the improvement of economic and political situation, the acceptance of new civilization and cultural achievements, and finding the way to take the people out of misery. In one of his first demands to the Istrian Parliament in Poreč, he asked that the Croatian should become the official language, along with Italian.
 
With the First World War, national fights were interrupted. Italian interest in the eastern part of the Adriatic coast became very obvious. A secret agreement was made in London in April 1915, according to which Italy was promised South Tyrol, a part of Dalmatia and Istria with Trieste and Gorizia.

Italy 

At the end of the First World War, Austria-Hungary was defeated in the battle of Vittorio Veneto and asked for an armistice, signed in Padova, on 3 November 1918.
Istria was consequently occupied by the Italian Royal Army, under the terms of the armistice. At the peace conference in Paris, Italy was between the winning powers, and obtained the suzerainty over Istria, according to the terms of the Treaty of Rapallo.

After the advent of Fascism in 1922, the portions of the Istrian population that were Croatian and Slovene were exposed to a policy of forced Italianization and cultural suppression. During the period between the two world wars, Italians eradicated Croatian and Slovenian public and national life. They abolished all Croatian schools, cultural institutions and associations, and Croatian names were Italianized. Croatians lost their right to education and religious practice in their maternal languages. The population emigrated to the Kingdom of Yugoslavia on a large scale. The organization TIGR, regarded as the first armed antifascist resistance group in Europe, was founded in 1927 and soon penetrated into Slovene and Croatian-speaking parts of Istria.
 
After the capitulation of Italy in the Second World War, The Yugoslav Partisans officially occupied the region, expelled the fascist authorities, and established the rule of the National Liberation Movement in Croatia which sought to incorporate Istra into the Croatian state. However, the Yugoslav executive was forced split Istria into two Zones: the Anglo-American-occupied Zone A and the Yugoslav-administrated Zone B. These zones would eventually be abolished by the Paris Peace Treaties of 1947. The capitulation of Italy, and the ensuing struggle over Istria, caused acts of massacres such as the Foibe massacres which were often partly or wholly committed by the local non-Italian population, due to the previous regime's oppression of non-Italians like such as forced Italianization which was the leading cause of resentment. This lingered and triggered the Istrian-Dalmatian exodus which significantly reduced the Italian population in Istria, particularly in urban areas.

Period of Yugoslavia
According to the Paris Peace Treaty of 1947, the territory between Novigrad and Trieste became the independent Free Territory of Trieste, while other parts were incorporated into Yugoslavia. The Free Territory of Trieste was also divided in two zones – Zone A (area around Trieste) and Zone B (the rest). Zone A was again under the Anglo-American administration, while Zone B was under the Yugoslav military administration, from which area most of the Italian population fled. After the dissolution of the Free Territory of Trieste in 1954, by London agreement, Italy was assigned Zone A, the region up to the present-day Slovenian/Italian border, while the remaining territory was incorporated into Yugoslavia as a part of its People's Republic of Croatia and the People's Republic of Slovenia. For the first time, the entire western coast of Istria became part of Croatia. The final border between the two states was defined in the agreement in the Italian town of Osimo (Treaty of Osimo) on 10 November 1975.

In independent Croatia
Following the break-up of Yugoslavia in 1991, and international recognition of independent states of Croatia and Slovenia, the division of Istria between Croatia and Slovenia runs on the former republic borders. In December 1992, Istria became one of the twenty counties in the Republic of Croatia. The Gulf of Piran area is the subject of an ongoing border dispute between Croatia and Slovenia.

See also

History of the Republic of Venice
History of Italy
History of Croatia
Istria County
Italianization
Roman Catholic Diocese of Poreč-Pula

References

Notes

Bibliography

External links
 

 
Geographic history of Italy
Istria
History of the Slovenes
Geographic history of Croatia